Petrolisthes is a genus of marine porcelain crabs, containing these extant species:

Petrolisthes aegyptiacus Werding & Hiller, 2007
Petrolisthes agassizii Faxon, 1893
Petrolisthes amoenus (Guérin-Méneville, 1855)
Petrolisthes armatus (Gibbes, 1850)
Petrolisthes artifrons Haig, 1960
Petrolisthes bifidus Werding & Hiller, 2004
Petrolisthes bispinosus Borradaile, 1900
Petrolisthes bolivarensis Werding & Kraus, 2003
Petrolisthes borradailei Kropp, 1984
Petrolisthes boscii (Audouin, 1826)
Petrolisthes brachycarpus Sivertsen, 1933
Petrolisthes cabrilloi Glassell, 1945
Petrolisthes caribensis Werding, 1983
Petrolisthes carinipes (Heller, 1861)
Petrolisthes celebesensis Haig, 1981
Petrolisthes cinctipes (J. W. Randall, 1840)
Petrolisthes coccineus (Owen, 1839)
Petrolisthes cocoensis Haig, 1960
Petrolisthes columbiensis Werding, 1983
Petrolisthes crenulatus Lockington, 1878
Petrolisthes decacanthus Ortmann, 1897
Petrolisthes desmarestii (Guérin, 1835)
Petrolisthes dissimulatus Gore, 1983
Petrolisthes donadio Hiller & Werding, 2007
Petrolisthes donanensis Osawa, 1997
Petrolisthes edwardsii (de Saussure, 1853)
Petrolisthes eldredgei Haig & Kropp, 1987
Petrolisthes elegans Haig, 1981
Petrolisthes elongatus (H. Milne-Edwards, 1837)
Petrolisthes eriomerus Stimpson, 1871
Petrolisthes extremus Kropp & Haig, 1994
Petrolisthes fimbriatus Borradaile, 1898
Petrolisthes galapagensis Haig, 1960
Petrolisthes galathinus (Bosc, 1802)
Petrolisthes gertrudae Werding, 1996
Petrolisthes glasselli Haig, 1957
Petrolisthes gracilis Stimpson, 1859
Petrolisthes granulosus (Guérin, 1835)
Petrolisthes haigae Chace, 1962
Petrolisthes haplodactylus Haig, 1988
Petrolisthes hastatus Stimpson, 1858
Petrolisthes haswelli Miers, 1884
Petrolisthes heterochrous Kropp, 1986
Petrolisthes hians Nobili, 1901
Petrolisthes hirtipes Lockington, 1878
Petrolisthes hirtispinosus Lockington, 1878
Petrolisthes hispaniolensis Werding & Hiller, 2005
Petrolisthes holotrichus Nobili, 1901
Petrolisthes japonicus (De Haan, 1849
Petrolisthes jugosus Streets, 1872
Petrolisthes kranjiensis Johnson, 1970
Petrolisthes laevigatus (Guérin, 1835)
Petrolisthes lamarckii (Leach, 1820)
Petrolisthes lazarus Ferreira, Santana-Moreno & Anker, 2020
Petrolisthes leptocheles (Heller, 1861)
Petrolisthes lewisi (Glassell, 1936)
Petrolisthes limicola Haig, 1988
Petrolisthes lindae Gore & Abele, 1974
Petrolisthes magdalenensis Werding, 1978
Petrolisthes manimaculis Glassell, 1945
Petrolisthes marginatus Stimpson, 1859
Petrolisthes masakii Miyake, 1943
Petrolisthes melini Miyake & Nakasone, 1966
Petrolisthes mesodactylon Kropp, 1984
Petrolisthes militaris (Heller, 1862)
Petrolisthes miyakei Kropp, 1984
Petrolisthes moluccensis (De Man, 1888)
Petrolisthes monodi Chace, 1956
Petrolisthes nanshensis Yang, 1996
Petrolisthes nigrunguiculatus Glassell, 1936
Petrolisthes nobilii Haig, 1960
Petrolisthes novaezelandiae Filhol, 1885
Petrolisthes obtusifrons Miyake, 1937
Petrolisthes ornatus Paul’son, 1875
Petrolisthes ortmanni Nobili, 1901
Petrolisthes perdecorus Haig, 1981
Petrolisthes platymerus Haig, 1960
Petrolisthes politus (Gray, 1831)
Petrolisthes polymitus Glassell, 1937
Petrolisthes pubescens Stimpson, 1858
Petrolisthes quadratus Benedict, 1901
Petrolisthes rathbunae Schmitt, 1921
Petrolisthes robsonae Glassell, 1945
Petrolisthes rosariensis Werding, 1982
Petrolisthes rufescens (Heller, 1861)
Petrolisthes sanfelipensis Glassell, 1936
Petrolisthes sanmartini Werding & Hiller, 2002
Petrolisthes scabriculus (Dana, 1852)
Petrolisthes schmitti Glassell, 1936
Petrolisthes squamanus Osawa, 1996
Petrolisthes teres Melin, 1939
Petrolisthes tiburonensis Glassell, 1936
Petrolisthes tomentosus (Dana, 1852)
Petrolisthes tonsorius Haig, 1960
Petrolisthes tridentatus Stimpson, 1859
Petrolisthes trilobatus Osawa, 1996
Petrolisthes tuberculatus (Guérin, 1835)
Petrolisthes tuberculosus (H. Milne-Edwards, 1837)
Petrolisthes unilobatus Henderson, 1888
Petrolisthes violaceus (Guérin, 1831)
Petrolisthes virgatus Paul’son, 1875
Petrolisthes zacae Haig, 1968

References

Porcelain crabs
Taxa named by William Stimpson